Juntas de Ofensiva Nacional-Sindicalista (JONS) was a nationalist and fascist movement in 1930s Spain, merged with the Falange Española into the Falange Española de las JONS in 1934.

History 
JONS was founded on 10 October 1931 as the fusion of the group around La Conquista del Estado (The Conquest of the State) of Ramiro Ledesma Ramos and the Juntas Castellanas de Actuación Hispánica (Castilian Councils of Hispanic Action) of Onésimo Redondo. JONS was a small organization, primarily based amongst students in Madrid and workers and peasants in and around Valladolid. Its followers were called "jonsistas" and the leadership of JONS was the Central Executive Triumvirate.

In 1933, JONS experienced a period of expansion and it started publishing a theoretical journal, JONS. Amongst other things, it engaged in trade union work in Castile. In January 1933, Gutiérrez Palma set up a transport workers union in Valladolid. Later the same year, JONS founded the Agrarian Trade Union Federation. In six months it had set up 175 trade unions, which together claimed around 3,000 members. During that year, Onésimo Redondo returned from exile in Portugal and restarted the publication Libertad.

JONS also expanded throughout the country. The party had its main strongholds in Valencia, Granada, Valladolid and Santiago de Compostela. It also formed nuclei in Zaragoza, Bilbao, Salamanca and Barcelona. The party also started publishing Revolución in Zaragoza, Unidad in Galicia and Patria Sindicalista in Valencia.

Merger with Falange Española 
At the national council of JONS, held clandestinely in Madrid on 12–13 February 1934, the organization formulated its intention to merge with the Falange Española of José Antonio Primo de Rivera. The merger formed the Falange Española de las Juntas de Ofensiva Nacional-Sindicalista, or FE-JONS.

During the Spanish Civil War, Francisco Franco forced a further merger with the very different traditional Carlists three years later to create FET y de las JONS, the Falange Española Tradicionalista y de las Juntas de Ofensiva Nacional-Sindicalista or Movimiento Nacional ("National Movement"), the only legal political party in Francoist Spain. The Movimiento was disbanded upon Spain's transition to democracy in the late 1970s.

Sources
La Organización Sindical Española. Escuela Sindical 1961. 1961. Madrid. pp. 33–34.

1931 establishments in Spain
1934 disestablishments in Spain
Falangist parties
Fascist parties in Spain
National syndicalism
Political parties disestablished in 1934
Political parties established in 1931
Political parties of the Spanish Civil War
Syncretic political movements